Lismore Speedway (also known as Castrol Edge Lismore Speedway) is a dirt track racing venue located in Lismore, New South Wales. It hosts a variety of motor sports and other events throughout February and April annually.

History 
The Speedway at its current location was founded on 22 November 1969 by Dutton Stibbard and Neil Mansell. It has been used for non-racing events, such as a baseball game in 1972 and a cricket match in 1994. It was severely impacted by Cyclone Debbie which caused extensive flooding across the region, including flooding the Speedy track and buildings. The facility celebrated its 50th anniversary in 2018 and held the Queensland Speedcar State Title for the first time in 2019.

Today it hosts a variety of Speedway racing events. These include V8 cars and monster trucks.

Track 
The track is 400 metres long on the pole. It is predominantly circular and constructed with a clay and sand mix. The track is 15 metres wide which is designed to provide room for side-by-side racing.

Lap records

External links
 Lismore Speedway official website

References

Speedway venues in Australia